The Tom Thomson Mystery is a book by Canadian judge William T. Little. It was published in 1970 by McGraw-Hill Ryerson.

Thomson is regarded by some as Canada's most famous painter. He died in July 1917, drowning in Canoe Lake in Ontario's Algonquin Park, and was buried there. Two days later, his family sent an undertaker to exhume the body and send it back for re-burial in Leith, Ontario. In October 1956, Little and some friends decided to dig up Thomson's original burial place at Canoe Lake.

The book tells the story of Thomson's life and the discovery made by Little and his friends.

Little's book is one of several that raised the Tom Thomson mystery to public prominence during the late 1960s/early 1970s.

References
Little, William T. The Tom Thomson Mystery. Toronto: McGraw-Hill Ryerson, 1970. .

Canadian non-fiction books
1970 non-fiction books
McGraw-Hill books
Books about conspiracy theories